Chih-Jen Lin is Distinguished Professor of Computer Science at National Taiwan University, and a leading researcher in machine learning, optimization, and data mining. He is best known for the open-source library LIBSVM, an implementation of support vector machines.

Biography
Chih-Jen Lin received his B.Sc. (1993) in Mathematics at National Taiwan University, and M.SE (1996) and Ph.D. (1998) in Operations at University of Michigan.

Awards and honors
 ACM Fellow (2015)
 For contributions to the theory and practice of machine learning and data mining.
 AAAI Fellow (2014)
 For significant contributions to the field of machine learning, and the development of a widely used SVM software.
 IEEE Fellow (2011)
 For contributions to support vector machine algorithms and software.

Selected works

Software
 LIBSVM implements the sequential minimal optimization algorithm for kernelized support vector machines. LIBSVM Homepage

Articles

References

External links
 Chih-Jen Lin Google Scholar, h-index is 63.

Academic staff of the National Taiwan University
Computer scientists
University of Michigan College of Engineering alumni
Living people
Scientists from Taipei
National Taiwan University alumni
Fellows of the Association for Computing Machinery
Fellows of the Association for the Advancement of Artificial Intelligence
Fellow Members of the IEEE
Machine learning researchers
Year of birth missing (living people)